Allen Smith may refer to:

 Allen Smith Jr. (1810–1890), American portrait painter
 E. Allen Smith, Auditor General of Ceylon, 1946–1953
 H. Allen Smith (1907–1976), American journalist, humorist and author
 H. Allen Smith (politician) (1909–1998), representative from California
 P. Allen Smith (born 1960), American television host, garden designer, conservationist, and lifestyle expert

See also
 Alan Smith (disambiguation)